Ciuchici is a commune in Caraș-Severin County, western Romania with a population of 1,257 people. It is composed of four villages: Ciuchici, Macoviște (Mákosfalva), Nicolinț (Miklósháza) and Petrilova (Petrilova).

References

Communes in Caraș-Severin County
Localities in Romanian Banat